The 1986–87 Liga Bet season saw Hapoel Bnei Nazareth, Maccabi Isfiya, Maccabi Herzliya and Hapoel Ashdod win their regional divisions and promoted to Liga Alef.

At the bottom, Hapoel Afikim, Beitar Kiryat Shmona (from North A division), Beitar Pardes Hanna, Hapoel Beit Eliezer (from North B division), Beitar Pardes Katz, Beitar Kfar Saba (from South A division), Hapoel Sderot and Hapoel Merhavim (from South B division) were all automatically relegated to Liga Gimel.

North Division A

North Division B

South Division A

South Division B

References
Alef and Bet Leagues, 1986-87 – 1993-94  Eran R, Israblog 

Liga Bet seasons
Israel
4